Emily Kendall Burt (born April 25, 1975) is an American former professional soccer player who featured primarily as a forward.

Early life 
Burt was born in Honolulu, Hawaii. She was raised in Menlo Park, California, and attended Menlo-Atherton High School. Burt later attended Stanford University, where she was a member of the Stanford Cardinal women's soccer and tennis teams. She took a hiatus from soccer in 1995 to focus on tennis, but returned to the sport the following season.

Career 
Burt played for Foothill FC of the Women's Premier Soccer League while working in the tech industry. She was selected in the 12th round of the 2000 WUSA Draft by the Atlanta Beat as the 96th overall selection.

When the WUSA ceased operations, Burt joined California Storm followed by Russian Women's Football Championship club FC Energy Voronezh.

Career statistics

Club
These statistics are incomplete and currently represent a portion of Burt's career.

References

External links 
 Player profile at Women's United Soccer Association
 Player profile at Stanford Cardinal

American women's soccer players
1975 births
Living people
Stanford University alumni
Atlanta Beat (WUSA) players
Philadelphia Charge players
Women's association football forwards
Stanford Cardinal women's soccer players
Stanford Cardinal women's tennis players
Women's United Soccer Association players